The 2016 NCAA Division Men's III Ice Hockey Tournament was the culmination of the 2015–16 season, the 33rd such tournament in NCAA history. It concluded with Wisconsin–Stevens Point defeating St. Norbert in the championship game 5-1. All First Round and Quarterfinal matchups were held at home team venues, while all succeeding games were played at the Herb Brooks Arena in Lake Placid, New York.

Qualifying teams
The following teams qualified for the tournament. Automatic bids were offered to the conference tournament champion of seven different conferences. Four at-large bids were available for the highest-ranked non-automatic qualifiers (overall seed in parentheses).

Format
The tournament featured four rounds of play. All rounds were Single-game elimination. The top four overall seeds were arranged so that the first- and fourth-seeded teams would be in the same semifinal bracket while the second- and third-seeded teams would play in the other.

Because the third western seed had a higher overall ranking than the second eastern seed the western team was given a bye into quarterfinal round. Because both teams that received byes in one bracket were from the west both were placed in the same quarterfinal bracket to cut down on travel. To further cut down on travel the remaining western team received the final bye and would play the second western seed in the quarterfinals.

The top eastern team received a bye into the second round and would play the winner of the match between the fourth- and fifth-seeded eastern teams. For the remaining quarterfinal bracket the second- and seventh-seeded eastern teams would play with the winner advancing to play the victor of the game between the third- and sixth-seeded eastern teams.

With the fourth overall seed being placed in the same quarterfinal as the first overall seed, the remaining bracket contained the second eastern seed as the top-ranked team.

In the First Round and Quarterfinals the higher-seeded team served as host.

Tournament Bracket

Note: * denotes overtime period(s)

All-Tournament Team
G: Max Milosek (Wisconsin–Stevens Point)
D: Alex Brooks (Wisconsin–Stevens Point)
D: Blake Thompson (St. Norbert)
F: Erik Cooper (St. Norbert)
F: Frankie DeAugustine (Massachusetts–Boston)
F: Eliot Grauer * (Wisconsin–Stevens Point)
* Most Outstanding Player(s)

Record by conference

References

External links
Division III Men's Ice Hockey Record Book

 
NCAA Division III ice hockey